Ryall may refer to:

People
 Chris Ryall (born 1969), American writer and editor in the comic book industry
 Daniel Bailey Ryall (1798–1864), American politician
 David Ryall (1935–2014), English actor
 Dee Ryall (born 1967), Australian politician
 George Ryall (born 1958), English professional golfer
 Henry Thomas Ryall (1811–1867), English engraver
 James Ryall (born 1980), Irish hurler
 John Ryall (1875–1953), New Zealand politician
 Rhiannon Ryall (active from 1983), pseudonym of an English-born Australian Wiccan
 Richard Ryall (born 1959), South African cricketer
 Sebastian Ryall (born 1989), Australian association football player
 Tony Ryall (born 1964), New Zealand politician
 William Bolitho Ryall (1891–1930), South African journalist, writer and biographer

Places
 Ryall, Dorset, England
 Ryall, Worcestershire, England
 Ryal, Northumberland, England

See also
 Riall, a given name and surname
Ryal (disambiguation)
 Joe Ryalls (1881-1956), English professional footballer
Ryhall, Rutland